A by-election for the seat of Alice Springs in the Northern Territory Legislative Assembly was held on 7 February 1976. The by-election was triggered by the resignation of Country Liberal Party (CLP) member Bernie Kilgariff, the Deputy Majority Leader, to run for one of two newly created seats in the Australian Senate for the Northern Territory in the 1975 federal election.

Results

 Preferences were not distributed.

References

1976 elections in Australia
Northern Territory by-elections